Vandeleumatidae is a family of millipedes belonging to the order Chordeumatida. Adult millipedes in this family have 28 or 30 segments (counting the collum as the first segment and the telson as the last).

Genera

Genera:
 Cyclothyrophorus Pocock, 1908
 Guipuzcosoma Vicente & Mauriès, 1980
 Hypnosoma Ribaut, 1952

References

Chordeumatida
Millipede families